The Austrian Football League (AFL) is the highest level of American football in Austria founded in 1984.
The Austrian Football League (AFL) has always been considered among the best and strongest leagues in Europe. The league plays by rules based on those of the NCAA. 

The Austrian Football League is the highest tier level and below that is a tier system consisting of teams playing in divisions I through division IV. Winners of each division move up to the next level of play. The Tyrol Raiders and Vienna Vikings which had dominated the league for much of the preceding decade announced their intention to leave for the European League of Football for the upcoming 2022 season. However, unlike teams in other countries that have made this move, the reserve team of both will remain a participant in the Austrian Football League.

History
The AFL was founded in 1984 by the teams such as the Salzburg Lions, Graz Giants, Vienna Ducks and Vienna Ramblocks. 

The AFL is commonly considered as one of the best American football leagues in Europe. This was especially so in the period from 2004 to 2011, when the European Football League final game the Eurobowl, was won seven out of eight times by an Austrian league AFL team.

In 2010, the Prague Panthers from the Czech Republic joined the league as the first team from outside of Austria. The Panthers were a member of the AFL until the 2016 season. In 2016, the Ljubljana Silverhawks from Slovenia joined, and in 2018, the Bratislava Monarchs from Slovakia entered the league.

The regular season currently consists of ten games and starts in mid-March; the playoffs continue through July. The final game, the Austrian Bowl, was held for the first time in 1984 in Salzburg, Austria.  Because homegrown players are one of the main focus points of the league, there are rule limitations for the numbers of foreigners. The rule has changed several times over the years and currently each roster can have a maximum of 6 American, Canadian, Mexican or Japanese professional import players, with two allowed on the field at the same time.

Teams

In 2023, the AFL will consist of:

Vienna Vikings 
Graz Giants
Swarco Raiders Tirol 
Vienna Dragons
Prague Black Panthers

Salzburg Ducks

GBG Graz Styrian Bears
Telfs Patriots

Austrian Bowl

All games

By Team

Notable Import Players & Coaches

 Anthony Thompson, 1993 AFL League MVP, Bulls 1993-94 & Mercenaries 1995 RB/LB, Played in NFL for Denver Broncos
 Eric Beavers, 1992 AFL League MVP, Graz Giants QB 1991-1993
 Doug Wilkerson, Graz Giants OL/DL 1987, was NFL All Pro player for the San Diego Chargers
 Tony Hunt, Former Vienna Viking RB & NFL player for the Eagles.
 Darvin Lewis, Former Graz Giants LB/RB, 2008 AFL defense player of the year
 Todd Hendricks, 1995 AFL League MVP, AFC Rangers WR/RB  1993, 1995-97, 2000
 Mark Helfrich, Former Vienna Viking QB 1997, former Oregon Ducks head coach
 Thomas Smythe, AFL Coach of the year, 1994-2006 Head coach Vienna Vikings, 8 AFL championships, 3 Eurobowl titles
 Hugh Mendez, 1993 AFL Coach of the year, AFL Champion 1993, Head coach Feldkich Dinos 1993-94, Klosterneuburg Mercenaries 1995
 Rick Rhoades, 2008 AFL Coach of the year, 2007-2011 Head coach Graz Giants, Austrian National team head coach
 Emmanuel Moody, Vienna Viking RB, Florida Gators
 Chris Gunn, AFL League MVP, Graz Giants QB
 Jason Johnson (quarterback), Swarco Raiders QB 2009.
 Bill Christensen, Graz Giants DB 1996-98
 George Paton, Vienna Vikings DB/RB 1993. Current GM for Denver Broncos
 Sean Shelton, 3 X AFL League MVP, Swarco Raiders QB
 , AFL Coach of the year, AFL Champion, Eurobowl Champion, Head coach Swarco Raiders
 Kevin Burke, (American Football) 2017 Austrian Bowl Game MVP, Vienna Vikings QB
 , AFL Coach of year & Former Vienna Viking DB, AFL Champions and Eurobowl Champion
 Cameron Frickey, 1999 AFL offense POY, 1998-2003 Vienna Vikings WR & current Woman's National team coach
 Clinton Graham, AFL Offense POY, Vienna Vikings, Prague Panthers and AFC Rangers RB.
 Eric Marty, 2010 Austrian Bowl game MVP, Danube Dragons QB
 Germaine Race, 2010 AFL Offense POY, St. Polten Invaders RB. Former NFL player
 Kyle Newhall-Caballero, 2012 AFL League MVP, Prague Panthers QB, NFL player & Scout
 Darius Robinson, Swarco Raiders DB & former NFL player, Clemson Tigers football
 Chris Rosier, AFL League MVP, Swarco Raiders, Vienna Vikings WR
 Lance Gustafson, AFL League MVP, Vienna Vikings LB/RB
 Paul Kujawa, AFL League MVP 1994, Graz Giants RB/LB 1994-97, Iowa Hawkeyes
 , 2011 Austrian Bowl Game MVP, Swarco Raiders RB
 , Swarco Raiders QB/WR
 D.J. Hernandez, AFL offense POY, Carinthina Lions QB, Brother of Aaron Hernandez
 Luke Atwood, Vienna Vikings QB/WR
 Reece Horn, Vienna Vikings WR
 Geoff Stults, Mercenaries player WR, (now Dragons)
 Jonathan Dally, former Dragons QB
 Brad Strohm, AFC Rangers QB 1995-96, 1998, LSU Tigers / Mississippi College
 Matt Sayre, 1996 AFL league MVP, Graz Giants QB 1994-96
 Mike McLaury, Graz Giants DL 1997-2002
 Cameron Reynolds, Vienna Vikings RB 1997-98, Oregon State
 Tim Nielson, AFL league MVP 1990, Graz Giants QB/RB 1989-1990, 1992

Austrian teams in international competitions

Despite the relatively small size of Austria, both the Austrian national American Football team and individual club teams of the AFL have enjoyed remarkable success in European competitions. The national team, whose players mostly play in the AFL (with a few also playing in the German Football League), has placed third at the 1995 European Championship of American football (hosted in Austria) and third at the 2010 European Championship, second at the 2014 European Championship (hosted in Austria), losing the final in double overtime to Germany in front of 27000 spectators at Vienna's Ernst-Happel-Stadion and placed second again in 2018. The Vienna Vikings have won the Eurobowl five times and reached the final ten times overall while the Tyrol Raiders have won it three times in five appearances in the final. Furthermore the Central European Football League has been won five times by Austrian teams both before and after it became a premier European competition.

The AFL Graz Giants own the first known European victory against a US college team in 1991. 
The Giants won the exhibition game 32–23 against Albany State University. 
The game was played in the United States on August 31, 1991.

References

External links

 Official website 
 Historical AFL scores

American football leagues in Europe
Sport in Austria
1984 establishments in Austria
Sports leagues established in 1984
American football in Austria
American football in Slovenia
Professional sports leagues in Austria
American expatriate sportspeople in Austria